Australia's Got Talent is an Australian reality television show, based on the original UK series, to find new talent. Nine announced that the show would be returning in 2016 for an eighth season. It is the second season to air on Nine after it was axed in 2013. Auditions are open for September and October 2015. On 28 October 2015, it was announced that Kyle Sandilands, Geri Halliwell, Dawn French and Timomatic have been replaced with a new panel of judges, they are Ian "Dicko" Dickson, Sophie Monk, Kelly Osbourne and Eddie Perfect. Julia Morris did not return as host as she is committed to another show and was replaced by Dave Hughes as the host.  For the first time, this season introduced the Golden Buzzer. The season premiered on 1 February 2016.

Changes

Golden Buzzer
This series saw the introduction of the new golden buzzer. During the auditions, as well as the standard buzzers, there was a golden buzzer placed in the centre of the judges' desk. Each judge was allowed to press this buzzer only once, and it would send that auditionee straight through to the live semi-finals regardless of the opinions of the other three judges.

Wildcard
This season will see the introduction of a viewer-voted Wildcard entry to send one lucky performer directly to the Grand Finale. Contestants who are not taken through to the semi-final by the celebrity judges can be voted back into the finals by viewers as Wildcards.

Semi-finalists

Semi-finals Summary

 Buzzed Out |  |

Semi-final 1 (22 February)

Semi-final 2 (28 February)

Semi-final 3 (29 February)

Semi-final 4 (6 March)

Semi-final 5 (7 March)

Finals Summary

Final – Top 11 (13 March) 

The top 11, (including Raw & Rugged who received the Judges' wildcard), perfromed once more for a spot in the Grand Finale. An audience vote followed after the show and only 5 acts returned for the Grand Finale with new performances.

Grand Finale (14 March) 

Guest Judge: Jack Black

Guest performer: Cosentino

Ratings

References

Australia's Got Talent
2016 Australian television seasons